Slate Falls First Nation is an Ojibwe First Nation band government in Ontario. It has a settlement at Slate Falls in Kenora District, Ontario. As of 2016, the First Nation had a registered population of 241 people, of which the on-reserve population was 9.

References

First Nations governments in Ontario
Ojibwe reserves in Ontario
Communities in Kenora District